John Howard Jones (born 23 February 1955) is a British musician, singer and songwriter. He had ten top 40 hit singles in the UK between 1983 and 1986; six of those 10 singles reached the top ten, including "What Is Love?", "New Song", and "Things Can Only Get Better". His 1984 album Human's Lib reached number one on the UK Albums Chart. Around the world, Jones had 15 top 40 hit singles between 1983 and 1992.  The 1986 hit single "No One Is to Blame" reached No. 4 on the US charts.  Four others placed in the US top 20.

Jones is associated with the 1980s Second British Invasion of the US. He has been described by AllMusic editor Stephen Thomas Erlewine as "one of the defining figures of mid-'80s synth-pop." He performed at the historic Live Aid concert in 1985.

Early life
Born in Southampton to Welsh parents, Jones spent his early years in Rhiwbina, Cardiff, South Wales, where he attended Heol Llanishen Fach primary school and then Whitchurch Grammar School. Jones is the eldest of four boys. His brothers, Roy, Martin, and Paul, are all musicians in their own right. Jones began taking piano lessons at age seven. He later attended the Royal Grammar School in High Wycombe, Buckinghamshire. The family moved to Canada when he was a teenager. His first band was Warrior, a progressive rock group. 

After returning to the UK, Jones attended the Royal Northern College of Music in Manchester in the mid-1970s while playing in various bands. He met Buddhist practitioner Bill Bryant, who wrote lyrics for some of Jones's songs and was a major influence in this period. The Jones brothers had a band called Red Beat in the late 1970s.

Career

1980s

Jones appeared as a solo artist in local venues in High Wycombe before inviting mime artist Jed Hoile to perform improvised choreography as Jones played behind him. In 1983, he hired the Marquee Club in London and invited record labels to come and see him perform. After a BBC Radio 1 session, Jones obtained support slots with China Crisis and Orchestral Manoeuvres in the Dark (OMD) before signing to Warner Music Group (WMG) in mid-1983. He has cited influences such as OMD (whose song "Enola Gay" was covered by Jones in early live sets), Keith Emerson and Stevie Wonder.

His first single, "New Song", was released in September 1983. It reached the top 30 in the US and the top 5 in the UK. He made his debut performance on BBC Television's Top of the Pops on 22 September 1983, and he watched his tape-delayed performance on a borrowed television resting on an ironing board before a concert at the University of Kent. He had four more hits over the next twelve months and a UK number one album, Human's Lib, which eventually went double platinum. Bill Bryant was credited with jointly writing the lyrics for six songs on the album. "New Song", "What Is Love?", and  "Pearl in the Shell"  all did well during 1983 and 1984. Human's Lib was certified gold and platinum in several countries. Jones had developed a loyal teen following. His parents ran his fan club.

In the summer of 1984, he released "Like to Get to Know You Well", which he said was 'dedicated to the original spirit of the Olympic Games.' Although it was not an official Olympic anthem for the Games in Los Angeles that summer, it was a worldwide hit. It reached No. 4 on the UK Singles Chart. The sleeve featured the song title in ten different languages while Jones sang the title line in French and German on the extended 12" version. The song also appeared in the film Better Off Dead (1985) and the video game Grand Theft Auto: Vice City Stories (2006).

In February 1985, Jones appeared with Stevie Wonder, Herbie Hancock, and Thomas Dolby at the 27th Grammy Awards ceremony; the group performed a medley of material from all four artists.

Jones' second LP was a remix album. It contained six songs, all but one of which had been previously released, but which appeared in elongated formats, including the multilingual version of "Like to Get to Know You Well". The album was certified gold in the UK.

In 1985, Jones released his second studio album, Dream into Action, which included backup work by the trio Afrodiziak. Afrodiziak included Caron Wheeler and Claudia Fontaine. His brother Martin played bass guitar. He had to have an extra string added to his instrument to play some of the bass lines, which had originally been scored for keyboard. One of the album's tracks, "No One Is to Blame", was later re-recorded, featuring Phil Collins as drummer and producer, and performing backing vocals.  (This second version appears on Jones's U.S. EP Action Replay, and also as a bonus track on the CD version of the following LP One to One).  Jones's most successful album, Dream into Action was popular worldwide; it reached number two in the UK and number 10 in the US and remained on the US chart for almost a year. The singles "Life in One Day", "Things Can Only Get Better", and "Look Mama" appeared on this album. In July 1985, Jones performed at Wembley Stadium as part of the Live Aid concert, singing his 1984 hit "Hide and Seek" and playing piano. He also embarked on a world tour.

The EP Action Replay was released in 1986. It included the re-recorded version of "No One Is to Blame". The song was Howard Jones's biggest US hit, reaching number 4 on the chart. However, by this time, his fortunes were changing in his native UK, and "No One Is to Blame" peaked at number 16. His next single, "All I Want", peaked at number 35, and would be his last UK top 40 hit. Jones released his third studio album, One to One, in October 1986, which peaked at number 10 in the UK and would be his last UK hit album, despite achieving gold sales status. Stateside, however, Jones continued to fill large arenas, and the single "You Know I Love You... Don't You?" went top twenty in 1986 on the Billboard Hot 100 singles chart.

In June 1988, Jones performed at Amnesty International's Festival of Youth at the Milton Keynes Bowl. Jones's subsequent album, Cross That Line (1989), performed poorly in the UK. However, the 1989 singles "Everlasting Love" (his second US Adult Contemporary number 1 hit after "No One Is to Blame") and "The Prisoner" charted in the United States. Jones continued to play large venues in the US during the late 1980s, and the Cross That Line Tour played major outdoor venues in the US in 1989.

1990s
Jones's 1992 album In the Running failed to chart in the United Kingdom. However, the single "Lift Me Up" (1992) charted in the United States.
 
With his 10-year tenure on the Warner Music label at an end, a greatest-hits compilation The Best of Howard Jones was released in 1993. The album peaked at number 36 in the UK, and by 2005 (12 years after its release) it was certified silver by the BPI for over 60,000 copies sold in the UK.

Jones had success as a songwriter for other artists in the early 1990s. He co-wrote the dance-music hits "Heaven Give Me Words" and "Your Wildlife" with the members of Propaganda. The tracks appeared on the 1990 album 1234; "Heaven Give Me Words" reached number 22 on the Adult Contemporary chart and "Your Wildlife" reached number 22 on the Dance Music/Club Play Singles chart.

After Jones' contract with WMG expired, he concentrated on production, songwriting, and running a restaurant. He started his own record label, Dtox, releasing a number of albums through the label, such as Working in the Backroom, produced in his own recording studio ('The Shed'). The album, which sold over 20,000 copies in the first year of release, was made available only at concerts and through his official website.

Jones toured the US and Europe over the next couple of years. Live Acoustic America came out in 1996 and People in 1998.

The track "If You Love" was featured on the soundtrack to the TV series Party of Five. Jones continued to produce and write for a number of artists during the mid to late 1990s, including Martin Grech, DBA, and Sandie Shaw.

2000s
In 2001, Jones played keyboards on the  Ringo Starr & His All-Starr Band tour.

On 20 September 2003, Jones played a 20th anniversary concert at the Shepherd's Bush Empire, London, commemorating the release of his first single. He was joined by Midge Ure and Nena, as well as his mime artist, Jed Hoile. A recording of this concert was later released on DVD. Jones continued to tour and write new music, collaborating with Robbie Bronnimann to co-write and co-produce music for Sugababes, and Jones' own 2005 album Revolution of the Heart. He toured playing gigs in the United States, Italy, Germany and Sweden and played a number of times at the Edinburgh Festival in 2006. The same year Jones provided a vocal for the song "Into the Dark" by Ferry Corsten for the latter's album, L.E.F. Jones also re-recorded "Things Can Only Get Better" in Simlish, the fictional language spoken by characters in Electronic Arts', The Sims 2.  Jones was also featured on Katrina Carlson's cover of "No One Is to Blame", which entered the US Hot Adult Contemporary Tracks chart in 2007.

In October 2006, Jones released "Building Our Own Future" as a podsafe track, as one of several established artists looking to use podcasts as a new means of promoting their music and tours.  The song debuted at number 1 on the PMC Top10 on 29 October 2006 and spent four weeks at the top of the chart. Howard's track "Revolution of the Heart" spent five weeks at number 1 on the PMC Top10 during 2007 and finished the year as the number 2 song in their annual countdown.

Jones embarked on an acoustic tour of Australia in 2007, beginning in Brisbane and concluding on 5 April in Perth. The Revolution Remixed & Surrounded album was followed in November by Live in Birkenhead. Jones performed another acoustic set, with other 1980s acts at the Retrofest, on 1 September 2007 at Culzean Castle in Ayrshire, Scotland. 

Jones is a member of Sōka Gakkai International, and is musical director of one of its choirs, the Glorious Life Chorus. The chorus performs some of his songs in its repertoire, including "Building Our Own Future" and "Respected". He returned to Australia again in 2009, this time accompanied by vocalist Laura Clapp and music technologist Robbie Bronnimann. On 26 February 2009, Jones was at the UK premiere of Roland's new V-Piano in Bristol, and performed "Hide and Seek". He continues to tour, and played the 'Big Hair Affair 2009' on 1 August 2009 at the Ryedale Arena, Pickering, North Yorkshire.

Ordinary Heroes was released in November 2009, and he toured London, Cardiff and Manchester with a string section and the Morriston Orpheus Choir (in St David's Hall in Cardiff). A single, "Soon You'll Go", preceded the album's launch. During an interview with the Stuck in the '80s podcast after the album's release, Howard Jones said "Soon You'll Go" was inspired by his daughter's upcoming departure to university, but that the song has come to take on broader meaning about cherishing the time he has with people.

Jones is a member of the board of directors for the Featured Artists Coalition, which was founded in 2009.

2010s

On 29 November 2011, a UK tour was announced. Human's Lib and Dream Into Action were performed in April 2012 across eight venues. A weekly radio series coincided with tour called Electronic 80s with Howard Jones on Absolute Radio.

In 2012, he appeared on "The Song That Changed My Life" on BYUtv, the cable station for Brigham Young University.

In 2015, the release of Engage was made on Jones' own D-TOX Records.

In 2016, he went out on tour supporting Barenaked Ladies as an opening act for their Last Summer on Earth US tour, reuniting with Orchestral Manoeuvres in the Dark.

In 2018, Jones joined fellow musician Steve Hogarth of Marillion by being present at the unveiling of a sculpture in tribute to David Bowie in Aylesbury, Buckinghamshire.

Transform, was released on 10 May, 2019. It features three collaborations with electronic musician BT. It is the second electronic album in a set of four, the first being Engage. In 2022 the third album was released, Dialogue consisting of eight songs. The fourth album in the set, and his fifteenth studio album Global Citizen is expected in 2023.

In the media
Jones has spoken of the media's negative perception of him. In 2006, he said: "My songs are not about drug-taking or debauchery or rock and roll. They're about positive thinking and challenging people's ideas. I wasn't fashionable. I never got good reviews. But I'm proud of the fact that I wasn't liked by the media... Pop music is so reactionary and bigoted. And I found that what's 'cool' is often very shallow and transient."

Personal life
Jones is married to Jan Smith. In the late 1980s, Jones began practising Nichiren Buddhism as a member of the worldwide Buddhist association Soka Gakkai International; he has credited his daily practice of chanting "Nam myoho renge kyo" (I devote myself to the Lotus Sutra) since 1991 as "having a profoundly positive effect on my life."

As of 2006, Jones resided in Creech St Michael, near Taunton, Somerset. Jones was a vegetarian for 42 years and became a vegan in 2019.

Discography

Studio albums
Human's Lib (1984)
Dream into Action (1985)
One to One (1986)
Cross That Line (1989)
In the Running (1992)

Working in the Backroom (1994)
Angels & Lovers (1997)
People (1998)
Piano Solos (For Friends and Loved Ones) (2003)
Revolution of the Heart (2005)

Piano Solos (For Friends and Loved Ones) Vol. 2 (2006)
Ordinary Heroes (2009)
Engage (2015)
Transform (2019)
Dialogue (2022)

Extended plays
The 12" Album (1984)
Action Replay (1986)

Bibliography
Howard Jones – Helen FitzGerald (1985); Bobcat, London –

References

External links

Official website
 Career Retrospective Interview from August 2015 with Pods & Sods
 Howard Jones interview on Stuck in the '80s podcast

1955 births
Living people
20th-century British pianists
21st-century British pianists
Alumni of the Royal Northern College of Music
British Buddhists
British electronic musicians
British keyboardists
British male pianists
British male singer-songwriters
British new wave musicians
British people of Welsh descent
British synth-pop new wave musicians
East West Records artists
Elektra Records artists
Live Here Now artists
MNRK Music Group artists
Male new wave singers
Members of Sōka Gakkai
Musicians from Hampshire
Musicians from Southampton
People educated at the Royal Grammar School, High Wycombe
People educated at Whitchurch Grammar School, Cardiff
People from Chipping Barnet
People from Wycombe District
Ringo Starr & His All-Starr Band members
Second British Invasion artists
Synth-pop singers